Invisibility is the state of an object that cannot be seen.

Invisible may also refer to:

Music

Artists
Invisible (band), an Argentine progressive rock band
The Invisible (band), an English alternative rock band

Albums
Invisible (Edyta album)
Invisible (La Ley album)
Invisible (Leeland album)
Invisible (Nightingale album)
Invisible (EP), by Paint It Black

Songs
"Invisible" (Alison Moyet song), 1984
"Invisible" (Christina Grimmie song), 2017
"Invisible" (D-Side song), 2003, covered by Clay Aiken
"Invisible" (Hunter Hayes song), 2014
"Invisible" (Jaded Era song), 2003, covered by Ashlee Simpson
"Invisible" (Linkin Park song), 2017
"Invisible" (Skylar Grey song), 2011
"Invisible" (Tilt song), 1999
"Invisible" (U2 song), 2014
"Invisible", by 5 Seconds of Summer, from the album Sounds Good Feels Good
"Invisible", by Anthrax, from the album Sound of White Noise
"Invisible", by Avail, from the album One Wrench
"Invisible", by Big Time Rush, from the album Elevate
"Invisible", by Bruce Hornsby, from the album Levitate
"Invisible", by Bucks Fizz, on the 12" single of "I Hear Talk"
"Invisible", by Dio, from the album Holy Diver
"Invisible", by Dream Evil, from the album Evilized
“Invisible”, a 2021 song by Duran Duran
"Invisible", by Everclear, from the album World of Noise
"Invisible", by Fischerspooner, from the album #1
"Invisible", by Gabrielle Aplin, from the album Dear Happy
"Invisible", by James LaBrie, from the album Elements of Persuasion
"Invisible", by Joe Satriani, from the album What Happens Next
"Invisible", by Julian Lennon, from the album Everything Changes
"Invisible", by Juliana Hatfield, from the album Whatever, My Love
"Invisible", by Leyland, from the album Invisible
"Invisible", by Lillix, from the album Falling Uphill
"Invisible", by Living Colour, from the album Shade
"Invisible", by Man Overboard, from the album Heavy Love
"Invisible", by Monolake, from the album A Bugged Out Mix
"Invisible", by Ornette Coleman, from the album Something Else!!!!
"Invisible", by Pet Shop Boys, from the album Elysium
"Invisible", by Sadist, from the album Sadist
"Invisible", by Sugar Ray, from the album Floored
"Invisible", by Switchblade Symphony, from the album The Three Calamities
"Invisible", by Taylor Swift, from the album Taylor Swift
"Invisible", by Zara Larsson, from the film Klaus

Other
Invisible Records, a record label

Books
Invisible (Auster novel), a 2009 novel by Paul Auster
Invisible (Hautman novel), a 2006 novel by Pete Hautman
The Invisibles, a comic book by Grant Morrison
Invisible (James Patterson novel), a 2014 James Patterson novel

Films
Invisibles (film), a 2005 film directed by Thierry Jousse
Invisible (2011 film), a 2011 film
Invisible (2015 film), a 2015 film
Invisibles (film), a 2018 French comedy-drama film
Les Invisibles (film), a 2012 film directed by Sébastien Lifshitz

See also